1937 Soviet Second League (Group V) was the 3rd championship since organizing professional competitions in the Soviet Union.

League standings

See also
 1937 Soviet Top League
 1937 Soviet First League
 1937 Soviet Second League B

External links
 Group V. RSSSF

1937
3
Soviet
Soviet